Don Handfield is an American filmmaker, author, and producer.

Education and acting career
Handfield studied theater and film at Ohio State University, graduating with a degree in journalism in 1993. His first job in media after college was as a production assistant at E! Entertainment Television. After moving to Los Angeles, his acting career included the role of Dwight Tanner, (Robert Duvall's son) in the 1998 film Deep Impact, and Pete Bradley in the 1997 film Defying Gravity. His films as an actor also include Captain Jack, Cause N' Effect, and A Reason to Believe. He has also appeared on television, including the shows Saved by the Bell: The New Class, Profiler, and JAG.

Directing, producing, and writing
Don Handfield is a partner of the film production company The Combine, which he founded with actor Jeremy Renner. In 2005 he wrote and produced the short film My Name Is..., which was awarded the Grand Jury Prize for a Narrative Short at the 2005 Atlanta Film Festival, which qualified the film for consideration by the Academy Awards. That year he was named Filmmaker Magazine as one of the "25 new faces of independent film".

In 2012 the film Touchback was written and directed by Handfield, starring actors Kurt Russell and Brian Presley. The movie was the first in history to film scenes inside Ohio Stadium during a live football game. The film was his first major motion picture as screenwriter and director. He was also the author of the novel Touchback, based on the movie, which has received a starred review from Publishers Weekly. He was also the writer of the UPN television series Seven Days. In 2011 he was announced as the screenwriter and producer for the upcoming Paramount film Slingshot. In 2013 he would produce the film Aztec Warrior.

Handfield produced The Founder, starring Michael Keaton, Nick Offerman, Laura Dern, John Carroll Lynch and Linda Cardellini. The film came about after Handfield tracked down the family of Richard "Dick" McDonald, one of the creators of the famous fast food chain, and optioned the McDonald brothers  life rights.

Handfield is the co-creator and Executive Producer of the upcoming History Channel scripted series Knightfall from A & E Studios.

Lawsuit
Handfield, Malpaso Productions (Clint Eastwood's production company), Warner Brothers, UTA and Randy Brown were all sued for copyright infringement by producer Ryan A. Brooks, who claimed the film "Trouble with the Curve" was based on a screenplay Brooks owned. Brooks' lawsuit was thrown out by the court, after the judge deemed it "frivolous" and "insulting".

Filmography

References

Living people
American male screenwriters
American film directors
American film producers
Date of birth missing (living people)
Year of birth missing (living people)